Seaverinia is a genus of fungi in the family Sclerotiniaceae. This is a monotypic genus, containing the single species Seaverinia geranii.

The genus was circumscribed by Herbert Hice Whetzel in Mycologia vol.37 (6) on page 703 in 1945.

The genus name of Seaverinia is in honour of Fred Jay Seaver (1877–1970), who was an American mycologist.

References

External links
Index Fungorum

Sclerotiniaceae
Monotypic Ascomycota genera